The 2000 Guernsey general election was held on 12 April 2000 to elect 45 members of the States of Guernsey.

Results

Castel

Forest

St Andrew

St Martin

St Peter Port

St Pierre du Bois

St Sampson

St Saviour

Torteval

Vale

See also
 Politics of Guernsey
 Elections in Guernsey

References

Elections in Guernsey
Guernsey
2000 in Guernsey
April 2000 events in Europe